Conimicut is a community located in eastern Warwick, Rhode Island.

Geography
It is at latitude 41.724 and longitude -71.383 with an average elevation of 46 feet. Conimicut appears on the East Greenwich U.S. Geological Survey Map.

It has a standard Zip code 02889. The population in ZIP Code Tabulation Area 02889 was 29,503 with 12,003 housing units; a land area of 8.77 sq. miles; a water area of 0.15 sq. miles; and a population density of 3,365.58 people per sq. mile per the 2000 Census.

The main road passing through Conimicut is West Shore Road.

References

External links 
City of Warwick Homepage
Conimicut Village Association

Villages in Kent County, Rhode Island
Villages in Rhode Island
Warwick, Rhode Island